James Hudson (13 October 1854 – 8 July 1912) was a New Zealand doctor and explorer. Hudson was born in London, United Kingdom, and died on the Spooners Range near Tapawera, New Zealand.

References

1854 births
1912 deaths
New Zealand general practitioners
New Zealand explorers
Medical doctors from London
English emigrants to New Zealand
Nelson City Councillors